St. Joseph High School is a Roman Catholic high school in the Barrhaven neighbourhood of Ottawa, Ontario, Canada. It is run by the Ottawa Catholic School Board. In athletics, the school teams are referred to as the St. Joseph Jaguars and the school mascot is a jaguar named McJagger. Commonly known as St. Joe's by the local community, St. Joe's has an enrollment of approximately 2500-3000 students, ranging from grades 7 to 12, as well as 115 staff members.

History

St. Joseph High School opened on 11 October 2002 to account for the recent growth of the Ottawa suburb of Barrhaven. The only other Catholic high school in the area, Mother Teresa High School, was desperately overcrowded when St. Joe's opened for the 2002-03 school year. The school began with an enrollment of over 1000 students. By 2005, this number had exceeded 1500 students.
The school bears the name of a former school on Broadview and a former school on Keyworth, which is now St. George Catholic Elementary School.

Facilities
The building of St. Joseph High School followed the design of Edward J. Cuhaci, mimicking Holy Trinity High School and many other local schools. St. Joe's has three floors, which include a chapel, two gymnasiums, a learning commons, an exercise room, two art rooms, and laboratories for chemistry, biology, physics, and general science. There are 27 portables outside the school, as well as one football field, 5 basketball nets (one during construction), and a 400-metre track. The Middle School is held on the top floor while the facilities for grades 9-12 are held on the bottom 2

Construction

Construction started on the school in summer 2019 to build a 30 room and a new gymnasium addition to the school to help its growing population. The addition will be similar to the ones built at Holy Trinity High School and other schools of the same design. During  the construction, one sports field was taken for more portables.

Extra-curricular activities

Athletics
St. Joseph offers a wide variety of over 25 sports teams, ranging from football to badminton. In its beginning 3 years alone, St. Joe's sent 6 teams to the Ontario Federation of Secondary Schools Athletic Association provincial championships, with the 2005-06 Junior Cheerleading team even placing first in Ontario. Every year since its opening, the school has won the CAHPERD award for its educational programs.

Arts
St. Joseph offers Art, Music, and Drama classes to students in all grade levels. Photography classes are offered to students in grades 10 through 12. In grade 12, the Drama class becomes a production class, in which, students put on a play. This play is usually entered in the Cappies Critics and Awards Program. In June 2014, St. Joseph production of Suite Surrender, won the Cappies Award for the Best Play in the capital region for the 2013-2014 season, and also two other award for Best Marketing and Publicity, and Best Comic Actress in a Play. St. Joseph has a total of 5 Cappie trophies.  There is also an Improv Club, a 7/8 as well as a high school band, and after school music lessons. St. Joseph hosts an annual Coffee House, Arts Night, and a Battle of the Bands to showcase the school's talent. There are also school dances and activities such as JagJog offered throughout the year.

Intramurals
Grade 7 and 8, as well as Grades 9-12, are offered lunch-time intramurals in sports such as floor hockey, basketball, or dodgeball. For their efforts, St. Joseph has been given the CIRA award for its programs.  High School intramurals are organised by the Recreational Leadership class, a class offered for grade 12 students at lunch.

Notable alumni
Elle Mills - YouTube vlogger
Nicholas Baptiste - NHL hockey prospect
MacKenzie Weegar - NHL player for the Calgary Flames
Serron Noel - NHL hockey prospect

See also
List of high schools in Ontario

References

150 years of Catholic Education in Ottawa-Carleton 1856-2006, Ottawa-Carleton Catholic School Board, 2006

External links
Ottawa Catholic School Board website
St. Joseph website

Catholic secondary schools in Ontario
High schools in Ottawa
Educational institutions established in 2002
2002 establishments in Ontario
Middle schools in Ottawa